The Parliament of Aix-en-Provence was the provincial parlement of Provence from 1501 to 1790. It was headquartered in Aix-en-Provence, which served as the de facto capital of Provence.

History
The region of Provence became a member of the Kingdom of France in 1481. Two decades later, in 1501, King Louis XII of France (1462–1515) established the Parliament of Provence in Aix-en-Provence. By 1535, the powers of the seneschal of Provence were given to the Parliament of Aix. It was modeled after the Parliament of Paris. It set administrative and regulatory guidelines for Provence. It was also in charge of police and healthcare, as well as the oversight of boarding houses, prostitution, religious freedom, etc. At times, the Parliament was closer to the King of France or the Pope, depending on its wishes. For example, in 1590, when it refused to follow Henry IV of France (1553–1610), the King established another parliament in Pertuis.

It comprised first presidents, présidents à mortier, advisors, general advocates, advocates for the poor, etc. By 1604, it became legal to purchase a hereditary position and pass it on to one's male heirs. By 1789, only 6% were commoners, the rest of which were aristocrats. A third were only recently ennobled, even though by 1769 it became practically impossible to join the Parliament if one failed to have four aristocratic ancestors.

It was dismantled in September 1790, during the French Revolution.

First Presidents
1501-1502: Michel Riccio (1445-1515)
1502-1507: Antoine Mulet
1507-1509: Accurse Maynier
1509-1530: Gervais de Beaumont
1530-1531: Thomas Cuisinier
1531-1541: Barthélemy de Chasseneuz
1541-1544: Guillaume Garçonnet
1544-1557: Jean Maynier
1557-1564: Jean-Augustin de Foresta (1520-1588)
1564-1590: Bernard Prévot
1590-1599: Artus de Prunières
1599-1616: Guillaume du Vair
1616-1621: Marc-Antoine d'Escalis
1621-1632: Vincent-Anne de Forbin-Maynier
1632-1636: Hélie Lainé
1636: Guillaume de Fieubet
1636-1642: Joseph de Bernet
1644-1655: Jean de Mesgrigni
1665-1671: Henri de Forbin-Maynier
1674-1690: Arnoul Marin
1690-1710: Pierre-Cardin Lebret
1710-1735: Cardin Lebret (1675-1734)
1735-1747: Jean-Baptiste des Gallois de La Tour
1748-1771: Charles Jean-Baptiste des Gallois de La Tour
1775-1790: Charles Jean-Baptiste des Gallois de La Tour

Président à mortier
1542: Jean Maynier d'Oppède 
1543: François de La Fonds (also Lafont) 
1553: Rémy Ambroix 
1554: Jean-Augustin de Foresta
1554: Louis Puget de Fuveau 
1558: François de Pérussis de Lauris 
1559: Gaspard Garde de Vins 
1568: Louis de Coriolis 
1573: Boniface de Pellicot 
1575: Claude de Pérussis 
1575: Robert de Montcalm 
1585: François d'Estienne de Saint-Jean 
1585: Louis Chaine (also Chène) 
1587: Raimond de Piolenc 
1595: Marc-Antoine Escalis 
1600: Laurent de Coriolis de Corbières
1604: Joseph Aimar de Montlaur 
1610: Honoré Aimar de Montsallier (also Aymar) 
1613: Jean-Baptiste Chaine 
1615: Vincent-Anne de Forbin-Mainier d'Oppède 
1616: Jean-Louis Monier de Châteaudeuil 
1621: Gabriel Estienne de Saint-Jean
1622: Antoine Séguiran de Bouc 
1624: Jean-Baptiste Forbin de la Roque-d'Anthéron 
1630: Jean-Augustin Foresta de la Roquette 
1632: Louis de Paule 
1643: Charles de Grimaldi-Régusse (1612-1687)
1625: Honoré de Coriolis 
1644: Lazare du Chaine de la Roquette 
1645L Henri de Forbin-Maynier d'Oppède 
1645: Melchior de Forbin de la Roque 
1650: Louis de Cormis de Bregançon 
1651: Pierre de Coriolis de Villeneuve d'Espinouse 
1655: Henri d'Escalis de Sabran de Bras 
1662: Auguste Thomas de la Garde 
1662: Jean de Simiane de la Cepède de la Coste 
1673: Jean-Baptiste de Forbin-Maynier d'Oppède 
1674: Gaspard Grimaldy de Régusse 
1674: Claude Milan de Cornillon 
1686: Joseph-Anne de Valbelle de Tourves
1690: Jean-Baptiste-Joseph de Coriolis de Villeneuve d'Espinouse 
1694: Silvy Raousset de Boulbon 
1694: Antoine Albert du Chaine de Saint-Martin-d'Alignosc 
1694: Pierre-Joseph de Laurens de Saint-Martin de Pallières 
1699: François Boyer de Bandol 
1702: Jean-Baptiste Thomassin de Saint-Paul 
1702: Jean-Baptiste de Maliverny 
1702: Honoré-Henri de Piolenc 
1705: Jean-Estienne de Thomassin de Saint-Paul
1709: Pierre-Joseph de Laurent de Saint-Martin de Pallières 
1712: Pierre de Coriolis d'Espinouse
1718: Cosme-Maximilien-Marcelin-Louis-Joseph de Valbelle de Sainte-Tulle
1718: Zacharie de Raousset de Boulbon 
1720: Charles de Grimaldi-Régusse 
1724: Charles-Louis-Sextius de Grimaldi-Régusse 
1731: Joseph-Claude de Maliverny
1731: Jean-Louis-Gabriel de Thomassin de Saint-Paul 
1733: Jean-Baptiste Bruny d'Entrecasteaux 
1736: François-Charles-Xavier de Coriolis de Villeneuve d'Espinouse
1740: André-Elzéard d'Arbaud de Jouques (1676-1744)
1740: Gaspard de Gueidan (1688-1767)
1742: Louis de Thomassin de Peynier 
1746: Jules-François-Paul Fauris de Saint-Vincens 
1747: Alexandre-Jean-Baptiste de Boyer d'Eguilles 
1748: Jean-Luc de Thomassin de Peynier 
1756: Joseph-Étienne de Thomassin de Saint-Paul 
1756: Bruno-Paul-Théodore Bruny d'Entrecasteaux (also Pierre-Paul-Théodore) 
1766: Pierre de Laurens de Peyrolles 
1767: Michel-Antoine d'Albert de Saint-Hippolyte
1768: André-Elzéard d'Arbaud de Jouques II (1737-1793)
1776: Jean-Louis-Martin Arlatan de Montaud 
1776: François-Marie-Jean-Baptiste de Cabre
1777: Jean-Baptiste Jérome Bruny de la Tour-d'Aigues
1782: Alexandre de Fauris de Saint-Vincens (1750-1815)
1782: Jean-Baptiste-Joseph-Guillaume-Bruno Bruny d'Entrecasteaux
1782: Michel-Gabriel-Albert d'Albert de Saint-Hippolyte

Counsellors 
Jean-François-Marie d'Arquier (1782)

References

Ancien Régime
1501 establishments in France
1790 disestablishments in France
Aix-en-Provence
Aix-en-Provence